The Howell Opera House is an opera house located in Howell, Michigan. The site is listed as historic by The Michigan State Historic Preservation Office. It is also listed on The National Historic Register as part of the Howell Downtown Historic District.

History
The Howell Opera House is a Victorian-style building with a seating capacity of 1,000 people.  Plans for the theater were drawn and executed by Detroit architect, Almon C. Varney at the cost of $10,000. Construction began in 1880 by Hunter and Holmes Contractors and doors were opened to patrons on December 30, 1881. The building is located at 123 W. Grand River.

As the central part of the town, the edifice served not only for artistic performances but as a venue for several local occasions such as high school commencement. The theater also served, for a short duration, as home to the Livingston County Circuit Court in 1889.

The Howell Opera House was first owned by the Stair Brothers, E.D. and Orin, who assumed ownership in 1884. The theater was later purchased by Arthur Garland in 1893  who utilized a portion of the space to produce custom-tailored suits.

In 1923, the building was closed by the fire marshal. This brought an end to its intended use as quarters for entertainment. For more than 70 years, The Howell Opera House served as storage for a local hardware store.

Renovation
In 2000, The Livingston Arts Council purchased The Howell Opera House  with plans to restore the patronage to function, once again, as a theater.  Renovations began in 2001 with a slow start due to lack of funding.  In 2007, the first installment of the development plan had been completed.

Renovations were made solely to the first floor. These renovations include refinished flooring and walls as well as new stairways. Plans have also been made for restoration of the second floor which houses the stage and balcony.

The renovated first floor of the Opera House is now available to rent for special events such as weddings and parties.

References

External links
 Howell Opera House official site
The Christman Company
Howell Opera House documentary

Buildings and structures in Livingston County, Michigan
Michigan State Historic Sites
Opera houses in Michigan
Theatres in Michigan
Victorian architecture in Michigan
Tourist attractions in Livingston County, Michigan
Historic district contributing properties in Michigan
Theatres completed in 1881
Music venues completed in 1881
1881 establishments in Michigan
National Register of Historic Places in Livingston County, Michigan
Opera houses on the National Register of Historic Places in Michigan